Kim Dong-min (born 16 August 1994) is a South Korean footballer who plays for Incheon United.

References

1994 births
Living people
South Korean footballers
K League 1 players
K League 2 players
Incheon United FC players
Gimcheon Sangmu FC players
Association football defenders